The Women's 1000m race of the 2011 World Single Distance Speed Skating Championships was held on March 12 at 12:00 local time.

Results

References

2011 World Single Distance Speed Skating Championships
World